Gossypium anomalum is a species of wild cotton in the family Malvaceae, native to drier parts of Africa. A crop wild relative of cultivated cotton, its genome has been sequenced.

Subtaxa
The following subspecies are accepted:
Gossypium anomalum subsp. anomalum – Cape Verde, Mauritania, Mali, Burkina Faso, Niger, Cameroon, Chad, Sudan, Eritrea, Somalia 
Gossypium anomalum subsp. senarense  – Angola, Namibia

References

anomalum
Cotton
Flora of Cape Verde
Flora of Mauritania
Flora of Mali
Flora of Burkina Faso
Flora of Niger
Flora of Cameroon
Flora of Northeast Tropical Africa
Flora of Angola
Flora of Namibia
Plants described in 1859